Labrys monachus is a bacterium which was isolated from silt from Lake Mustijary in Estonia.

References

Further reading

External links
Type strain of Labrys monachus at BacDive -  the Bacterial Diversity Metadatabase

Hyphomicrobiales
Bacteria described in 1985